P. Nandakumar  is an Indian politician serving as the MLA of Ponnani Constituency since May 2021. Nandakumar is a prominent Kerala state leader of Communist Party of India(Marxist).

References 

Kerala MLAs 2021–2026
Communist Party of India (Marxist) politicians from Kerala
Year of birth missing (living people)
Living people